Belilios Public School (abbreviated as BPS) is the first government school for girls in Hong Kong, founded in 1890. It was also the first bilingual school in Hong Kong. It is in Tin Hau.

History 
In 1890, the Hong Kong Government set up the Central School for Girls at Old Bailey Street as the counterpart to the Central School (Queen's College, Hong Kong). Mr. Emanual R. Belilios, a Jewish philanthropist donated HK$ 25 000 for a new building for the Central School for Girls in 1893, at the old site of Central School where a three-storeyed building was erected between Hollywood Road and Gough Street.

The school was renamed Belilios Public School in honour of Mr. Belilios. In 1946 after the Second World War, BPS moved to Hospital Road. In April 1965, the school moved again, to its present premises in Tin Hau Temple Road. To mark the occasion, a new school motto (Climb High, See Wide), a school song and a new school badge were created.

Founder

The successful opium trader Emanuel Raphael Belilios was born in Calcutta, India, on 14 November 1837. His father was Raphael Emanuel Belilios, member of a Jewish Venetian family. Emanuel married Simha Ezra in 1855, and in 1862 he settled in Hong Kong and engaged in trade. Belilios had a house in the mid-levels, and another on the Peak of Hong Kong Island. He kept a camel at his peak residence.

In the 1870s, Belilios was chairman of the Hongkong and Shanghai Hotels, Limited. In 1876, he became Chairman of the Hongkong and Shanghai Banking Corporation. Belilios died in London on 11 November 1905.

"Thirty years after he set foot on Hong Kong, he was appointed to the Legislative Council in recognition of his many contributions to Hong Kong society. However, Mr. Belilios was best remembered for being a great philanthropist. Before he made the $25,000 donation to enable our school to have a new 3-storeyed building, he had donated $5,000, one third of the total costs for setting up the Alice Memorial Hospital, which served as one of the major teaching hospitals for students of the Hong Kong College of Medicine for Chinese (which later became the Faculty of Medicine of the University of Hong Kong). With a view to promoting the welfare and education of Chinese girls who were driven to crimes and prostitution by poverty, Mr Belilios also made available the funding for establishing a probation home for girls. There was and is also an abundance of scholarships established with Mr Belilios' donations either during his lifetime or upon death. They have enabled needy students to pursue education at the universities".

Class Structure
There are 24 classes; this includes 4 classes (B,P,S,H) each for F.1- F.6.

House

Achievements 
BPS is one of the most prestigious secondary schools in Hong Kong. While its students generally achieve superb academic results, the school promotes also all-rounded development in different fields of arts, music and sports.  Entrance hurdles are high and the school is reputed to have one of the toughest admission criteria in Hong Kong.

The following were its achievements in the year 2020/21 –

Student Honour List / Scholarship

The Chinese University of Hong Kong  

The Faculty of Social Science	Architectural Studies	Head’s List (Service); Dean’s List	

Admission Scholarships for Local Students; CW Chu Foundation Scholarship	

Journalism and Communication	Talent Development Scholarship	

Global Communication	Lanson Exchange Scholarships	

Wu Yee Sun College	--	Academic Excellence Scholarship; Social Services Award

	

The Hong Kong University of Science and Technology  

School of Business and Management	BBA(ACCT &IS)	Dean’s List (2019-20 Spring)	

BBA(FINA & IS)	Academic Exchange – Queen’s University (2019-20 Spring)	

BBA(GBUS & MARK)	University Scholarship	

BBA(IS & MARK)	Dean’s List (2019-20 Spring)	

BSc(QFIN)	Dean’s List (2019-20 Fall);

Dean’s List (2019-20 Spring); 

HSBC Hong Kong Scholarship; 

The Joseph Lau Luen Hung Charitable Trust Scholarship	

Business and Management	Dean’s List (2019-20 Spring)	

School of Engineering	--	Dean's list Award 2019-20	

Hong Kong Baptist University	

Bachelor of Arts (Hons.) in English Language and Literature	Dean’s List (Semester 1)	

Bachelor of Business Administration (Hons.) (Applied Economics Concentration)	Dean’s List (Semester 1, 2)

Bachelor of Business Administration (Hons.) (Finance Concentration)	Dean’s List (Semester 1);

President’s Honour Roll (Semester 2)	

Bachelor of Chinese Medicine and Bachelor of Science (Hons.) in Biomedical Science	Dean’s List (Semester 1);
President’s Honour Roll (Semester 2)	

Bachelor of Communication (Hons.) in Film (Animation and Media Arts Concentration)	Dean’s List (Semester 1)	

Bachelor of Communication (Hons.) in Public Relations and Advertising (Organizational Communication Concentration)	Dean’s List (Semester 2)

Bachelor of Social Work (Hons.)	Dean’s List (Semester 1, 2)	

The Hang Seng University of Hong Kong	

Bachelor of Business Administration (Honours)	SPSS – Outstanding Performance Scholarship 

Bachelor of Business Administration (Honours) in Management	2016/17 Entrance Scholarship (Scheme 2) – Sponsored by C H Chan Scholarship Fund	

Academic Accomplishment Scholarship – Sponsored by C H Chan Scholarship Fund
Bachelor of Journalism and Communication (Honours)	SPSS – Talent Development Scholarship 

Bachelor of Social Sciences (Honours) in Asian Studies	Dean's Award – Sponsored by C H Chan Scholarship Fund	

SPSS – Outstanding Performance Scholarship (2019/20)
Bachelor of Translation with Business (Honours)	Hui Hoy & Chow Sin Lan Charity Fund Limited	

Computer and Business Translation Scholarship 2018/19
SPSS – Outstanding Performance Scholarship (2019/20)

The Hong Kong Polytechnic University

Bachelor of Science in Radiography	First Class Honours

Academic

Hong Kong Virtual University (Department of Computer Science and Engineering, The Hong Kong University of Science and Technology)	Chemists Online Self-study Award Scheme (COSAS) 2020	--	Diamond Award	

Samsung Hong Kong
Samsung Solve for Tomorrow 2020
--	Merit Award

Aesthetics

St. John's Cathedral Life Enrichment Centre	2020 Creative Art Contest	--	The Most Promising Creative Talent Award

Hong Kong International Youth Artists Society	International Painting Competition 2020 - Children's Group	--	Excellence,
Most Creative Award

Others

Society of Japanese Language Education Hong Kong
2019-20 Society of Japanese Language Education Hong Kong Scholarship for Senior Secondary Japanese Language Subject Students
--	Certificate of Scholarship

Results of Public Examinations 
Belilios Public School is one of the 38 schools that have ever produced top scorers in The Hong Kong Diploma of Secondary Education Examination (HKDSE).

7 x 5** "Top Scorers" are described by media and HKEAA as candidates who obtained perfect scores of 5** in each of the four core subjects and three electives.

8 x 5** "Super Top Scorers" are described by media and HKEAA as candidates who obtained seven Level 5** in each of the four core subjects and three electives, and an additional Level 5** in the Mathematics Extended (M1/M2) module.

 2017: Sze Yik Yan: awarded the “Charles Frankland Moore Award” presented by the Hong Kong Sino-British Fellowship Trust Scholars' Association for attaining the highest aggregated marks in HKDSE Examination 2017 and was admitted to HKU MBBS program.

Notable alumni

 Lee Sun Chau (周理信, 1890–1979) – One of the first female Chinese doctors of Western medicine in China.
 Denise Yue – Former Secretary for the Civil Service and former Permanent Secretary for Commerce, Industry and Technology (Commerce and Industry)
 Nellie Fong (方黃吉雯) – Former member of the Executive Council of Hong Kong and Legislative Council of Hong Kong
 Canny Leung – Entrepreneur, author, lyricist and screenwriter
 Money Lo –  Practising barrister and former actress
 Charmaine Li - Actress
 Gladys Liu - Former member of the Australian House of Representatives
 Lau Wai Ming - Cantonese opera artist, Arts Advisor and Artistic Director
 Lily Leung (梁舜燕) - Late Hong Kong television actress
 Little Thunder (門小雷) - Cartoonist
 Jenny Kwok - Adjunct Assistant Professor at The University of Hong Kong (School of English)
Yoyo Kwok (郭曉妍) – member of Cantopop girl group Lolly Talk

See also
 Education in Hong Kong
 List of schools in Hong Kong

References

External links 

Belilios Public School Official Website
Belilios Old Girls Association
Belilios Old Girls Foundation
The Hongkong and Shanghai Hotels, Limited: History
Royal Asiatic Society Hong Kong Branch Newsletter, December 2004

Girls' schools in Hong Kong
Eastern District, Hong Kong
Educational institutions established in 1890
Government schools in Hong Kong
Secondary schools in Hong Kong
1890 establishments in Hong Kong